The International Patent Institute (IIB) (French: Institut International des Brevets) was an intellectual property organisation established on June 6, 1947 in The Hague, Netherlands, by a set of European countries, i.e. France, Belgium, Luxembourg and the Netherlands. It was integrated into the European Patent Organisation on January 1, 1978. Its purpose was to centralize patent searching and archiving as well as the resources needed for the prior art searches for its member countries.

The integration of the International Patent Institute and the European Patent Organisation led to the creation of the European Patent Office's branch in Rijswijk in the Netherlands, a town close to The Hague. This branch is one of three locations (along with Munich and Berlin) where European patent applications may be filed.

See also 
 Intellectual property organization
 Patent Cooperation Treaty (PCT)
 Strasbourg Convention (1963)
 World Intellectual Property Organization (WIPO)
 United International Bureaux for the Protection of Intellectual Property (BIRPI)

References 

European patent law
Intellectual property organizations
Organizations established in 1947
Former international organizations
Organizations disestablished in 1978
1947 establishments in the Netherlands